Nathan Soule (August 7, 1790 – January 9, 1860) was an American politician who served one term as a U.S. Representative from New York from 1831 to 1835.

Biography 
Born in Dover Plains, New York, Soule resided at Fort Plain.
He completed preparatory studies.

Congress 
Soule was elected as a Jacksonian to the Twenty-second Congress (March 4, 1831 – March 3, 1833).
He served as member of the New York state assembly, 1837.

Soule died on January 9, 1960, and is buried in Pine Plains Cemetery in Clay, New York.

Sources

Jacksonian members of the United States House of Representatives from New York (state)
19th-century American politicians
People from Dover Plains, New York
1790 births
1860 deaths

Members of the United States House of Representatives from New York (state)